My Web was a social bookmarking website launched by Yahoo! in June 2005. It allowed users to bookmark a web page, along with a description, either just for him/herself, for selected contacts or for everyone. The user could also add tags so that other users could search for tags and see the bookmarked site. Users could add contacts to their My Web account, which allowed them to view the user's tags and also some tags that the viewer submitted.

In late 2006, Yahoo! introduced an improved Yahoo! Bookmarks service, with a tagging facility, and encouraged My Web users to transfer their bookmarks to this service.

In February 2009, Yahoo! announced plans to shut down MyWeb on March 18, 2009. MyWeb bookmarks are automatically available for use within Yahoo! Bookmarks, and users were encouraged to switch to Delicious if they preferred a social bookmarking experience.

References

Discontinued Yahoo! services
Internet properties established in 2005
Internet properties disestablished in 2009
Defunct American websites